is the venture capital firm affiliated to Mizuho Bank,  the second-largest Japanese bank in terms of assets. The firm has headquarters in Tokyo.

The firm has ¥49.6 billion JPY under management, focusing on information technology and biotechnology investments. Over 600 Mizuho companies have gone public. According to Nikkei, Mizuho is the fifth-largest venture capital firm in Japan.

Mizuho Capital was formed in 2002 by the merger of Fujigin Capital, Tokyo Venture Capital and IBJ Investment. Three firms were subsidiaries of Fuji Bank, Dai-Ichi Kangyo Bank and the Industrial Bank of Japan respectively. Mizuho Capital has also made acquisitions of other companies, including of Vantec. Mizuho then sold its shares of Vantec in 2011.

See also 
Mizuho Financial Group

References

External links 
 Mizuho Capital Co., Ltd.
 (Translated by Google)      Mizuho Capital Co., Ltd.

Financial services companies based in Tokyo
Capital
Venture capital firms of Japan